Tebenna is a genus of moths in the family Choreutidae.

Species

Tebenna agalmatopa (Meyrick, 1926)
Tebenna agelasta (Bradley, 1965)
Tebenna alliciens (Meyrick, 1926)
Tebenna balsamorrhizella Busck, 1904
Tebenna bjerkandrella (Thunberg, 1784)
(Tebenna bradleyi) Clarke, 1971 (mostly treated as a synonym of Tebenna micalis)
Tebenna carduiella Kearfott, 1902
(Tebenna caucasica) Danilevsky, 1976 (mostly treated as a subspecies of Tebenna bjerkandrella)
Tebenna chingana Danilevsky, 1969
Tebenna chodzhajevi (Gerasimov, 1930)
Tebenna chrysotacta (Meyrick, 1933)
Tebenna chrysoterma (Meyrick, 1932)
Tebenna cornua 
Tebenna fuscidorsis (Zeller, 1877)
Tebenna galapagoensis Heppner & Landry, 1994
Tebenna gemmalis (Hulst, 1886)
Tebenna gnaphaliella (Kearfott, 1902)
Tebenna immutabilis (Braun, 1927)
Tebenna inspirata (Meyrick, 1916)
Tebenna lapidaria (Meyrick, 1909)
Tebenna leptilonella (Busck, 1934)
Tebenna micalis (Mann, 1857)
Tebenna onustana (Walker, 1864)
Tebenna piperella (Busck, 1904)
Tebenna pretiosana (Duponchel, 1842)
Tebenna pychnomochla (Bradley, 1965)
Tebenna silphiella (Grote, 1881)
Tebenna submicalis Danilevsky, 1969
Tebenna yamashitai Arita, 1987

External links
 choreutidae.lifedesks.org

Choreutidae
 
Taxa named by Gustaf Johan Billberg